Juan José Ortega (October 27, 1904 – December 27, 1996) was a Mexican film director, producer and screenwriter. He was active during the Golden Age of Mexican cinema, and directed over 40 films between 1942 and 1966.

Filmography

director
 Flor de fango (1942)
 Lo que sólo el hombre puede sufrir (1943)
 La razón de la culpa (1943)
 La hija del cielo (1943)
 El rosario (1944)
 El abanico de Lady Windermere (1944)
 Toda una vida (1945)
 Sendas del destino (1945)
 La mujer legítima (1945)
 La casa de la zorra (1945)
 Amar es vivir (1946)
 La insaciable (1947)
 El ángel caído (1949)
 Zorina (1949)
 Cuando el alba llegue (1950)
 Ritmos del Caribe (1950)
 Lodo y armiño (1951)
 La mentira (1952)
 Piel canela (1953)
 Yo no creo en los hombres (1954)
 Me gustan todas (1954)
 Frente al pecado de ayer (1955)
 Corazón salvaje (1956)
 No me olvides nunca (1956)
 Una lección de amor (1956)
 Tropicana (1957)
 Cuentan de una mujer (1959)
 His First Love (1960)
 En carne propia (1961)
 Ay Chabela...! (1961)
 La moneda rota (1962)
 'Monte Escondido' o (Leonardo Moncada) (1962)
 Pueblo de odios (1962)
 Horizontes de sangre (1962)
 Entre bala y bala (1963)
 Herencia maldita (1963)
 Las bravuconas (1963)
 El río de las ánimas (1964)
 Frente al destino (1964)
 Los murciélagos (1964)
 Preciosa (1965)
 Pacto de sangre (1966)

References

External links
 

1904 births
1996 deaths
Mexican film directors
Mexican film producers
20th-century Mexican screenwriters
20th-century Mexican male writers
People from Matehuala